Sandy McPeak (February 21, 1936 – December 31, 1997) was an American actor best known for such films and television series as Winnetka Road, L.A. Law, Centennial, Ode to Billy Joe, Patton, The Osterman Weekend, Kelly's Heroes and Blue Thunder.

Biography 

Sandy McPeak died of a heart attack in Nevada City, California on 31 December 1997.

Filmography

Film

Television

References

External links
 
 

American male film actors
American male television actors
20th-century American male actors
1936 births
1997 deaths